The 1983 NCAA Division I Men's Basketball Championship Game was the final game of the 1983 NCAA Division I men's basketball tournament. It determined the national champion for the 1982–83 NCAA Division I men's basketball season.  The game was played on April 4, 1983, at The Pit in Albuquerque, New Mexico and paired top-ranked, #1 seed Midwest Regional Champions, the Houston Cougars, and sixteenth-ranked, #6 seed West Regional Champions, the NC State Wolfpack.

The first half of the national championship game favored NC State. Not only did the Wolfpack lead 33–25, but Houston's Clyde Drexler picked up four first-half fouls. The Cougars opened the second half with a dominating 17–2 run to seize a seven-point lead, 42–35. NC State was able to keep the game close, as Houston's star center Hakeem Olajuwon checked out of the game multiple times to receive oxygen, leading the Cougars to slow the pace of the game in order to protect the lead. Tied at 52 with 44 seconds remaining, NC State held the ball for a final shot attempt. Houston's Benny Anders narrowly missed stealing the ball as the clock ticked down. After gathering the deflected ball nearly 30 feet from the basket, Dereck Whittenburg launched a desperation shot that fell short of the rim. Olajuwon hesitated in fear of a goaltending call, allowing Lorenzo Charles to catch the ball and dunk it for the 54–52 victory. One of the indelible images in tournament history is of winning coach Jim Valvano running onto the court after the game ended looking for Whittenburg.

NC State's magical, improbable postseason run and national championship win, highlighted by Charles' game-winning dunk, remain a legendary representation of March Madness.

Participants

NC State

Despite a preseason ranking of #16 in the AP poll, the Wolfpack sputtered to a 9–7 record after losing at Maryland on January 29. Three close victories in the ACC Tournament saved NC State from missing the NCAA Tournament altogether. Three of the team's four victories on the road to the Final Four came by one or two points. The Wolfpack trailed with a minute or less to play in six of their eight postseason games before this game.

West
NC State (6) 69, Pepperdine (11) 67
NC State 71, UNLV (3) 70
NC State 75, Utah (10) 56
NC State 63, Virginia (1) 62
Final Four
NC State 67, Georgia (4) 60

Houston

Houston was ranked #14 in the AP poll to open the season, and fell to 5–2 after a 72–63 loss to #1 Virginia in Tokyo on December 16, 1982. The Cougars then ran off a 26-game winning streak, capturing the #1 ranking in the process, that was capped by a 94–81 victory over #2 Louisville to advance to the National Championship Game.

Midwest
Houston (1) 60, Maryland (8) 50
Houston 70, Memphis (4) 63
Houston 89, Villanova (3) 71
Final Four
Houston 94, Louisville (1) 81

Starting lineups

Game summary

NC State led at halftime by a score of 33–25. Houston was hampered by foul trouble that plagued star Clyde Drexler, who picked up three fouls early in the first half yet was begging to stay in the game. NC State sophomore guard Terry Gannon drew a controversial charging foul against Drexler to put him at four and leave him one foul away from disqualification; replays showed, and Drexler maintained later, that Gannon had appeared to grab Drexler's legs and pull him down with him and thus should have been called for a defensive foul.

In the second half, the Cougars came out with a second wind and established control of the game, eventually taking a seven-point lead at 52–45. Since the game was played in Albuquerque, players had to deal with the city's mile-high altitude. The Cougars' star center, Hakeem Olajuwon, had problems adjusting to the environment and tired quickly, needing to check out of the game multiple times so he could put on an oxygen mask and recover.

With Olajuwon on the bench, Houston head coach Guy Lewis decided that in order to protect the lead and Olajuwon's health at the same time, the Cougars slowed the game down. This enabled the Wolfpack to return to their standby strategy of extending the game. Houston's free throw shooting was very suspect entering the game (60.9% on the season), which worked greatly in NC State's favor as they were able to rally back and even the score at 52 in the final two minutes.

On what would be the last Houston possession, Valvano called for his players to back off and let freshman guard Alvin Franklin bring the ball up the court and stand by while Houston passed the ball around before they committed their foul. Valvano's strategy was to foul Franklin once he got the ball back, and Whittenburg did exactly that with 1:05 left in regulation.

The move was largely psychological, according to Whittenburg. Since Franklin was the youngest player on the Houston squad, everyone on the NC State side felt he could not handle the pressure of the moment with a potential championship at stake. The theory proved correct as Franklin missed the free throw, and the Wolfpack grabbed the rebound.

Valvano called timeout with 44 seconds left and drew up a play for senior guard Dereck Whittenburg that called for the team to pass him the ball with ten seconds left on the clock so he could take the final shot.

Houston needed a defensive stop so they could get another chance to close out the game. Lewis decided to move from the man-to-man defense his team had been running the whole game to a half court zone trap defense. The Wolfpack, who were not expecting the defensive adjustment, were forced to deviate and began passing the ball around just to keep the Cougars from stealing it. Houston nearly got the turnover it was looking for when Whittenburg made an errant pass to Gannon that Drexler nearly came away with before the sophomore regained control of the ball. The ball eventually wound up in the hands of guard Sidney Lowe, who gave it to forward and fellow senior Thurl Bailey in the corner.

Trying to keep the ball moving, as he had been double teamed as soon as he received the pass, Bailey looked back toward Whittenburg, who was approximately thirty feet away from the hoop near midcourt. Bailey threw what Whittenburg would later call a "poor fundamental" overhanded pass which Houston's Benny Anders, guarding Whittenburg on the play, was in position to steal. At this point, Whittenburg hearkened back to his high school days with Morgan Wootten at DeMatha Catholic High School, where he was taught to always catch the basketball with both hands. If Whittenburg had not attempted to do so in this case, Anders may have gotten the steal and a game-winning breakaway layup. In college basketball at the time, the game clock continued to run after a made field goal, and the Wolfpack likely would not have had time even to inbound the ball. As it was, Anders knocked the ball out of Whittenburg's hands, but Whittenburg quickly regained control.

The clock, meanwhile, had ticked down to five seconds and Whittenburg was still standing a significant distance from the goal, Once he regained control, Whittenburg turned and launched a desperation shot to try and win the game for NC State. The shot's trajectory took it to the front of the basket where Olajuwon was covering Wolfpack center Lorenzo Charles. As he watched the shot, Olajuwon said he knew the shot was going to come up short but he also did not want to go for the ball too early because of the potential for goaltending. Charles took advantage of the indecision by Olajuwon and went up for the air ball, then in one motion scored the go-ahead points with a two-handed tip-in dunk. The final two seconds ticked off the clock before Houston could inbound the ball, and with that the game ended and the Wolfpack were the national champions.

Despite the loss, Olajuwon was named Tournament MOP as he collected 41 points, 40 rebounds, and 15 blocked shots in the Final Four alone. To date, this remains the last time a player from the losing team was named Most Outstanding Player.

It was NC State's second NCAA championship. Their first championship was in 1974, when they defeated the Marquette Warriors. The Wolfpack became the first team to win the NCAA Tournament with at least 10 losses.

It also marked Drexler's final college game, as he entered the 1983 NBA Draft with a year of eligibility remaining and was selected 14th overall by the Portland Trail Blazers. In 1995, he returned to Houston and rejoined Olajuwon after the defending champion Rockets traded Otis Thorpe to the Trail Blazers for him in the middle of the season, and he helped lead the Rockets to a second straight NBA championship.

Broadcast call on the final shot

References

NCAA Division I Men's Basketball Championship Game
NCAA Division I Men's Basketball Championship Games
Houston Cougars men's basketball
NC State Wolfpack men's basketball
College sports in New Mexico
Basketball competitions in New Mexico
Sports in Albuquerque, New Mexico
NCAA Division I Men's Basketball Championship Game
NCAA Division I Basketball Championship Game
Events in Albuquerque, New Mexico